Emilie Ågheim Kalkenberg (born 6 July 1997) is a Norwegian biathlete who represents the Skonseng youth team.

At the 2018 IBU Open European Championships, Kalkenberg won bronze in the mixed relay together with Kaia Wøien Nicolaisen, Håvard Bogetveit and Fredrik Gjesbakk.

She made her World Cup debut in the 2017–18 season, finishing 69th in  Oberhof. After several lowly performances, she broke the top 20 with a 20th place in  Canmore in the 2018–19 season, also recording a 2nd place in the Canmore relay. In the 2019–20 season, her best finishes were 26th and 15th in Kontiolahti.

She hails from Skonseng. When she was a child, Kalkenberg suffered from myalgic encephalomyelitis for two years, being diagnosed at Rikshospitalet. Her parents credit Live Landmark's "Lightning Process" for Kalkenberg's recovery.

References

External links
 
 
 
 
 

1997 births
Living people
People from Rana, Norway
Norwegian female biathletes
Biathletes at the 2022 Winter Olympics
Olympic biathletes of Norway
Sportspeople from Nordland
21st-century Norwegian women